Carl Adam Jörgen Düberg, born 9 July 1956 in Limhamn, Malmö, is a Swedish actor. He is the son of Axel Düberg, also an actor.

Düberg graduated from the Swedish National Academy of Mime and Acting in Stockholm in 1980. He has been with the Helsingborg City Theatre's permanent ensemble since 1992.

Filmography

Films

Television

Theater

Selected roles 
 2015 – Den stressade by Ludvig Holberg, directed by Jan Hertz,

References 

1956 births
Living people
Swedish male actors